Emanuele "Lele" Molin (born 12 February 1960) is an Italian professional basketball coach. He is currently an assistant coach of the Italian basketball team, Aquila Basket Trento, since 2017.

Coaching career
In 2005, Molin signed with the Russian team, PBC CSKA Moscow. In 2011, Molin was assigned as the head coach of Real Madrid Baloncesto, after head coach Ettore Messina stepped down in the position.

References

External links
 

1960 births
Living people
Italian basketball coaches
Pallacanestro Cantù coaches
PBC CSKA Moscow coaches
Real Madrid basketball coaches
Spanish basketball coaches